The Lost City (Spanish: La ciudad perdida) is a 1950 Mexican drama film directed by Agustín P. Delgado and starring Martha Roth, Roberto Romaña and Esperanza Issa.

The film's sets were designed by the art director Ramón Rodríguez Granada.

Cast
 Martha Roth 
 Roberto Romaña 
 Esperanza Issa
 Arturo Soto Rangel
 José Baviera 
 Carlos Valadez 
 Juan Garcia
 Joaquín García Vargas
 Mario García 'Harapos'
 José G. Cruz 
 Aurora Walker 
 Fernando Galiana 
 Carmen Manzano 
 Lupe Carriles

References

Bibliography 
 María Luisa Amador. Cartelera cinematográfica, 1950-1959. Centro Universitario de Estudios Cinematográfico, 1985.

External links 
 

1950 films
1950 drama films
Mexican drama films
1950s Spanish-language films
Films directed by Agustín P. Delgado
Mexican black-and-white films
1950s Mexican films